Pseudocellus boneti is an arachnid species in the order Ricinulei. It occurs in the Cacahuamilpa cave system in Guerrero, Mexico.

References 

 Bolívar y Pieltáin, 1942 : Estudio de un Ricinulideo de la caverna de Cacahuamilpa, Guerrero, Mexico. Revista de la Sociedad Mexicana de Historia Natural, vol. 2, n. 3, p. 197-209

Cave arachnids
Ricinulei
Animals described in 1942
Endemic spiders of Mexico
Natural history of Guerrero